The British Hockey League was the top-flight ice hockey league in the United Kingdom from 1980 until 1996 (with a short break between 1981 and 1982), when it was replaced by the Ice Hockey Superleague and the British National League. The league replaced three regional leagues: the Inter-City League in southern England, the English League North in northern England and the Northern League in Scotland.

The league was sponsored by Heineken until 1993 and during this period was best known as the Heineken League.

The league changed format several times. The top level Premier Division was formed in 1983, and a second tier Division One was formed in 1986, being split into North and South conferences for the 87/88 and 93/94 seasons. The third tier Division Two was founded in 1987, renamed English Division One the following season and split from the league in 1992 and later dissolved. In 1996 a major reorganization of the league structure led the two remaining divisions to split into different leagues; resulting in the dissolution of the British Hockey League and the creation of the Ice Hockey Superleague to replace the premier division, and the British National League to replace division 1, respectively.

Durham Wasps and Whitley Warriors were the only two teams to consistently feature in the top division of the BHL throughout the duration of the league's history.

Premier Division

Teams

Altrincham Aces (1982-1983)
Aviemore Blackhawks (1980-1981)
Ayr Bruins (1980-1981, 1982-1992)
Basingstoke Bison (1993-1996)
Billingham Stars (1980-1981, 1982-1987, 1990-1994)
Blackpool Seagulls (1982-1983)
Bracknell Bees (1991-1995)
Cardiff Devils (1989-1996)
Dundee Rockets (1982-1989)
Durham Wasps (1980-1981, 1982-1996)
Fife Flyers (1980-1981, 1982-1991, 1992-1996)
Glasgow Dynamos (1980-1981, 1982-1983)
Humberside Seahawks (1991-1996)
Milton Keynes Kings (1994-1996)
Murrayfield Racers (1980-1981, 1982-1995)
Nottingham Panthers (1982-1996)
Peterborough Pirates (1985-1986, 1987-1995)
Richmond Flyers (1982-1983)
Sheffield Steelers (1993-1996)
Slough Jets (1995-1996)
Solihull Barons (1986-1991)
Southampton Vikings (1982-1983, 1984-1985)
Streatham Redskins (1982-1989)
Sunderland Chiefs (1982-1983)
Whitley Warriors (1980-1981, 1982-1996)

Champions
1980/81 Murrayfield Racers
1981/82 N/A (competition not held)
1982/83 Dundee Rockets (section A) / Durham Wasps (section B) / Altrincham Aces (section C)
1983/84 Dundee Rockets
1984/85 Durham Wasps
1985/86 Durham Wasps
1986/87 Murrayfield Racers
1987/88 Murrayfield Racers
1988/89 Durham Wasps
1989/90 Cardiff Devils
1990/91 Durham Wasps
1991/92 Durham Wasps
1992/93 Cardiff Devils
1993/94 Cardiff Devils
1994/95 Sheffield Steelers
1995/96 Sheffield Steelers

Division One

Teams

Altrincham Aces (1983-1985)
Aviemore Blackhawks (1987-1988)
Ayr Bruins (1992-1993)
Basingstoke Bison (1990-1993)
Billingham Stars (1987-1990, 1994-1996)
Blackburn Hawks (1991-1992, 1993-1996)
Blackpool Seagulls (1983-1985, 1986-1988)
Bournemouth Stags (1983-1985, 1986-1987)
Bracknell Bees (1990-1991, 1995-1996)
Cardiff Devils (1987-1989)
Chelmsford Chieftains (1993-1996)
Deeside Dragons (1983-1985, 1987-1989)
Dumfries Vikings (1993-1996)
Fife Flyers (1991-1992)
Glasgow Dynamos (1983-1985, 1986-1989, 1990-1991)
Grimsby Red Wings (1983-1985)
Guildford Flames (1993-1996)
Humberside Seahawks (1989-1991)
Irvine Wings (1986-1987)
Kirkcaldy Kestrels (1986-1988)
Lee Valley Lions (1984-1985, 1986-1995)
London Raiders (1988-1989, 1990-1995)
Manchester Storm (1995-1996)
Medway Bears (1986-1991, 1992-1996)
Milton Keynes Kings (1991-1994)
Murrayfield Racers (1995-1996)
Oxford City Stars (1986-1987, 1993-1994)
Paisley Pirates (1993-1996)
Peterborough Pirates (1983-1985, 1986-1987, 1995-1996)
Richmond Flyers (1983-1985, 1986-1989)
Sheffield Steelers (1992-1993)
Slough Jets (1986-1995)
Solihull Barons (1983-1985, 1993-1996)
Southampton Vikings (1983-1984, 1986-1988)
Streatham Redskins (1989-1990, 1993-1994)
Sunderland Chiefs (1983-1985, 1986-1989)
Swindon Wildcats (1986-1996)
Telford Tigers (1986-1996)
Trafford Metros (1986-1992, 1993-1995)

Champions
1983/84 Southampton Vikings
1984/85 Peterborough Pirates
1985/86 Solihull Barons
1986/87 Peterborough Pirates
1987/88 Telford Tigers (north) / Billingham Stars (south)
1988/89 Cardiff Devils
1989/90 Slough Jets
1990/91 Humberside Seahawks
1991/92 Fife Flyers
1992/93 Basingstoke Bison
1993/94 Milton Keynes Kings (north) / Slough Jets (south)
1994/95 Slough Jets
1995/96 Manchester Storm

English Division One

Teams

Basingstoke Bisons (1988-1990)
Birmingham Eagles (1987-1989)
Blackburn Hawks (1990-1991)
Bournemouth Stags (1987-1988)
Bracknell Bees (1987-1990)
Bristol Phantoms (1987-1988)
Chelmsford Chieftains (1987-1992)
Deeside Demons (1987-1988)
Harringay Racers (1990-1992)
Humberside Seahawks (1988-1989)
London Raiders (1987-1988, 1989-1990)
Medway Bears (1991-1992)
Medway Marauders (1987-1988)
Milton Keynes Kings (1990-1991)
Oxford City Stars (1987-1992)
Peterborough Titans (1987-1989)
Richmond Flyers (1990-1991)
Richmond Raiders (1987-1988)
Sheffield Sabres (1989-1992)
Solihull Barons (1991-1992)
Solihull Knights (1987-1989)
Southampton Knights (1987-1988)
Streatham Bruins (1987-1988)
Streatham Redskins (1991-1992)
Sunderland Chiefs (1989-1992)
Wightlink Raiders (1991-1992)

Champions
1987/88 London Raiders
1988/89 Humberside Seahawks
1989/90 Bracknell Bees
1990/91 Milton Keynes Kings
1991/92 Medway Bears

See also
British ice hockey league champions

References

 
Defunct ice hockey leagues in the United Kingdom
Sports leagues established in 1982
1982 establishments in the United Kingdom
1996 disestablishments in the United Kingdom
Defunct multi-national ice hockey leagues in Europe